Mecyclothorax bembidioides is a species of ground beetle in the subfamily Psydrinae. It was described by Blackburn in 1879.

References

bembidioides
Beetles described in 1879